"My First Kiss", 2010 song by 3OH!3 and Kesha

My First Kiss may also refer to:

Film
My First Kiss (film), 2008 film directed by David Wexler

Music
"My First Kiss", by Hi-Standard from Love Is a Battlefield (EP), later covered by Andrew W.K. on The Japan Covers
"My First Kiss", by Another Bad Creation from It Ain't What U Wear, It's How U Play It